Lev Konstantinovich Bogomolets (January 11, 1911, Biysk, Tomsk Governorate,  Russian Empire — July 10, 2009, Saint Petersburg, Russia) was a Soviet Russian painter, a member of the Saint Petersburg Union of Artists (before 1992 known as the Leningrad Union of Artists), who lived and worked in Saint Petersburg, regarded as one of representatives of the Leningrad school of painting, most famous for his landscape paintings.

See also
 Leningrad School of Painting
 List of 20th-century Russian painters
 List of painters of Saint Petersburg Union of Artists
 Saint Petersburg Union of Artists

References

Bibliography 
 Бродский В. Жизнеутверждающее искусство // Ленинградская правда, 1957, 11 октября.
 Герман М. Первые впечатления. Заметки о живописи и графике на осенней выставке // Вечерний Ленинград, 1961, 23 сентября.
 Выставка произведений ленинградских художников 1961 года. Каталог. Л., Художник РСФСР, 1964. С.10.
 Лев Константинович Богомолец. Выставка произведений. Каталог. - Л: Художник РСФСР, 1982.
 Directory of members of the Leningrad branch of Union of Artists of Russian Federation. Leningrad, Khudozhnik RSFSR, 1987. Р.16.
 Лев Богомолец. Живопись. Акварели. Этюды. Миниатюры. СПб., 1992.
 Соловьев В. Д. Русские художники XVIII—XX веков. Справочник. 1994, 1996 гг.стр. 453.
 Государственный Русский музей. Живопись. Первая половина XX в. Каталог. А-В, Т.8. СПб, 1997 г. стр. 75. (Кат.№ 378, Ж-6963).
 Художники народов СССР. Биобиблиографический словарь. Т.1. М., Искусство, 1970. С.435.
 Вольпина В. Б. Художественная и нравственная высота Льва Богомольца // Декоративное искусство. 2003, № 3. С.102—104.
 Каталог. Московский международный художественный салон ЦДХ—2003. М., 2003. стр. 135—138.
 Лев Богомолец. Альбом. Текст Вольпиной В. Б. СПб., «Золотой век», 2004.
 Иванов С. Неизвестный соцреализм. Ленинградская школа. СПб., 2007. С.387, 388, 390-392, 395, 398, 400, 401, 403, 404, 406, 441, 442, 444, 445. , .
 Художники - городу. Выставка к 70-летию Санкт-Петербургского Союза художников. Каталог. Петрополь, 2003. С.33, 178.
 Кривонденченков С. О преемственности традиций русского пейзажа. К 100-летнему юбилею художника Л. К. Богомольца // Петербургские искусствоведческие тетради. Вып. 21. СПб, 2011. С.41-45.

1911 births
2009 deaths
People from Biysk
People from Tomsk Governorate
20th-century Russian painters
Russian male painters
21st-century Russian painters
Soviet painters
Socialist realist artists
Leningrad School artists
Members of the Leningrad Union of Artists
Repin Institute of Arts alumni
20th-century Russian male artists
21st-century Russian male artists